Henrik Asheim (born 21 August 1983) is a Norwegian politician for the Conservative Party. He was leader of the Norwegian Young Conservatives from 2008 to 2012, and Minister of Higher Education from 2020 to 2021. He has also been an MP for Akershus since 2013 and the party's first deputy leader since 2022.

Political career

Party politics
In 2007, Asheim was elected to Bærum municipal council. He was leader of the Norwegian Young Conservatives, the youth wing of the Conservative Party from 2008 to 2012. He had previously been deputy leader.

He was elected the leader of the Bærum Conservatives on 29 November 2021, defeating the incumbent Siw Wikan with 91 votes.

Following Jan Tore Sanner's announcement that he would step down as deputy leader, Asheim was among the favourites to succeed him, alongside Nikolai Astrup and Ine Marie Eriksen Søreide. The latter later announced she wouldn't be seeking the deputy leadership, and Asheim was subsequently designated as first deputy leader on 17 February 2022. He was formally elected at the party conference on 3 April 2022.

Parliament
In the 2013 general election, he was elected to the Storting for Akershus. In the Storting, he was a member of the Standing Committee on Education, Research and Church Affairs. He was reelected in 2017 and 2021. 

After Nikolai Astrup was appointed to the government on 17 January 2018, Asheim succeeded him as the chair of the Standing Committee on Finance and Economic Affairs. He held this position until he himself was appointed to the government on 24 January 2020, and was succeeded by Mudassar Kapur.

Following the Solberg cabinet's defeat in the 2021 election, Asheim became the Conservative Party's spokesperson for labour and social policy; and Second Deputy Parliamentary Leader. He held the latter post until October 2022, when he was replaced by Jan Tore Sanner.

Government minister

Acting minister of education
Asheim served as acting Minister of Education and Research in Solberg's Cabinet from September to November 2017, during Torbjørn Røe Isaksen parental leave.

Minister of Higher Education
Asheim was appointed minister of higher education on 24 January 2020 after the Progres Party withdrew from government.

After exams where cancelled for the school term 2020-21, Asheim proposed alternatives to still have it, notably oral exams via Skype or home exams for written ones.

On 5 November, Asheim briefed rectors and leaders of universities and colleges of new COVID-19 measures in higher education. One of those measures included more proposed use of digital lessons. He expressed that the sector seemed to take pandemic seriously and did their best to limit the spread of the virus in society.

In March 2021, Asheim proposed an amendment to the University and College Act in the wake of several reports of unfair treatment of students from staff members. He also announced that the government’s first action would be to clarify the regulations for universities and colleges, before looking at what could be improved. Asheim added that a hearing for an amendment would quickly scheduled.

When a recording of a Polish professor was leaked, where he said that the Medical University of Gdańsk could benefit from falsely reporting failing students, Asheim called Polish authorities to clear up in the matter after Norwegian students reported the incident. The professor was eventually fired at the end of the month (March 2021), and Asheim praised the university for taking swift action.

After calls from students who expressed that exams should be improved or abolished, Asheim came out against the latter in June. He didn’t clarify what the government would do to improve exams, but expressed that there should be variation in exams. He also expressed hope for staff and students to find common ground to improve exams together.

Personal life
Asheim is openly gay. He is currently in a relationship with Simon Stisen, whom he met in July 2021.

References

External links
 

1983 births
Living people
Conservative Party (Norway) politicians
Members of the Storting
Bærum politicians
Gay politicians
Norwegian LGBT politicians
21st-century Norwegian politicians
LGBT legislators
LGBT conservatism